Giuseppe Fenaroli Avogadro (24 March 1760, in Brescia – 26 January 1825, in Brescia) was an Italian politician and friend of Napoleon I.

References

External links

Politicians from Brescia
1760 births
1825 deaths